Neodymium tantalate is an inorganic compound with the chemical formula NdTaO4. It is prepared by reacting neodymium oxide and tantalum pentoxide at 1200 °C. It reacts with a mixture of tantalum pentoxide and chlorine gas at high temperature to obtain Nd2Ta2O7Cl2. It is ammonolyzed at high temperature to obtain oxynitrides of Nd-Ta.

Properties
 
Neodymium tantalate forms violet crystals of the monoclinic system, with space group I 2/a, cell parameters a = 0.55153 nm, b = 1.12388 nm, c = 0.51184 nm, β = 95.731°, Z = 4.

There is a metastable high-pressure phase of the monoclinic system, space group P 21/c, cell parameters a = 0.75920 nm, b = 0.54673 nm, c = 0.77022 nm, β = 100.032°, Z = 4.

Neodymium tantalate is insoluble in water.

See also
 Neodymium
 Tantalum
 Tantalate

References

External links 

 
Tantalates
Neodymium compounds